The Uppland Runic Inscription 605  is a lost Viking Age runestone engraved in Old Norse with the Younger Futhark runic alphabet. It was located at Stäket, in Upplands Bro Municipality. The style was possibly Pr3.

Inscription
Transliteration of the runes into Latin characters

 [· iskirun · harþiʀ · totiʀ · lit · risti · runiʀ · ati · sik · sialfan · hn · uil · austr · fara · auk · ut · til · iursala · fair · risti · runiʀ ·]

Old Norse transcription:

 

English translation:

 "Ingirún(?) Harðr's daughter, had the runes carved in memory of herself. She wants to travel to the east and abroad to Jerusalem. Fótr(?) carved the runes. "

References

Runestones in Uppland